The 1983 Kansas Jayhawks football team represented the University of Kansas in the Big Eight Conference during the 1983 NCAA Division I-A football season. In their first season under head coach Mike Gottfried, the Jayhawks compiled a 4–6–1 record (2–5 against conference opponents), finished in seventh place in the conference, and were outscored by opponents by a combined total of 320 to 296. They played their home games at Memorial Stadium in Lawrence, Kansas.

The Jayhawks upset 10th ranked USC in Los Angeles 26–20 in what remains their only game against USC in school history.

The team's statistical leaders included Frank Seurer with 2,789 passing yards, Kerwin Bell with 498 rushing yards, and Bob Johnson with 1,154 receiving yards. Seurer, Mike Arbanas, Paul Fairchild, E. J. Jones, and Eddie Simmons were the team captains.

Schedule

References

Kansas
Kansas Jayhawks football seasons
Kansas Jayhawks football